The Fugitive Investigative Strike Team, or FIST operations were a series of operations conducted by the United States Marshals to capture violent fugitives wanted by state and federal law enforcement agencies in the United States. Nine operations were conducted between the years of 1981 and 1986.

History

In October 1979, the Attorney General transferred the responsibility of investigating and monitoring certain fugitives from the Federal Bureau of Investigation to the U.S. Marshals Service. 105 U.S. Marshal Deputies were trained as Enforcement Specialists who would oversee investigation and apprehension of fugitives in their respective districts.

To support these deputies, the Marshals Service created the Fugitive Investigative Strike Team concept.  Fugitive Investigation Strike Teams were meant to bolster districts experiencing a heavy load of fugitive activity. The FIST was made up of a number of investigators who could be deployed in operations to any district in the country in order to investigate and quickly apprehend fugitives.  The primary targets of these operations were "Class 1" offenders, which included escaped federal prisoners, bail jumpers, parole violators and probation violators.

The FIST worked primarily in the United States but also collaborated with foreign officials to apprehend international fugitives, notably in the Caribbean.

Operations

Nine FIST operations were conducted over five years in Florida, California, the New England states, Washington D.C., Michigan and the Southwest United States. The operations often included stings, such as the Puño Airlines sting.

See also
Operation Flagship

Further reading
usmarshals.gov

References

Fugitives
United States Marshals Service